Dorcadion mimomucidum is a species of beetle in the family Cerambycidae. It was described by Stephan von Breuning in 1976. It is known from Portugal.

See also 
Dorcadion

References

mimomucidum
Beetles described in 1976